Never Give a Sucker an Even Break (known in some international releases as What a Man!) is a 1941 Universal Pictures comedy film starring W. C. Fields. Fields also wrote the original story, under the pseudonym "Otis Criblecoblis." Fields plays himself, promoting an extravagant screenplay he has written. As he describes the script to a skeptical producer, the often surreal scenes are shown.

The title is derived from lines from two earlier films. In Poppy (1936), he tells his daughter, "If we should ever separate, my little plum, I want to give you just one bit of fatherly advice: Never give a sucker an even break!" In You Can't Cheat an Honest Man (1939), he tells a customer that his grandfather's last words, "just before they sprung the trap", were, "You can't cheat an honest man; never give a sucker an even break, or smarten up a chump."

Fields fought with studio producers, directors, and writers over the content of his films. He was determined to make a movie his way, with his own script and staging, and his choice of supporting players. Universal finally gave him the chance, and Never Give a Sucker an Even Break was the result. Fields hand-picked most of the supporting cast. He chose Universal's young singing star Gloria Jean to play his niece, and hired two of his favorite comedians, Leon Errol and Franklin Pangborn, to play supporting roles. Margaret Dumont, best known as the Marx Brothers' matronly foil, was cast as the haughty "Mrs. Hemogloben." Fields was paid $125,000 for his performance, and $25,000 for his original story.

Plot
At the Hollywood studios of Esoteric Pictures, W. C. Fields, playing himself, is seen admiring a billboard advertising his previous film, The Bank Dick (1940). He encounters various hecklers and minor calamities, including a rude, sassy diner waitress (Jody Gilbert). His devoted niece, Gloria Jean, is on her way to rehearse some songs at the studio, where she demonstrates her classically trained coloratura soprano. Fields himself is also on the premises, to pitch a script to Esoteric producer Franklin Pangborn.

Pangborn reads through the script, which comes to life in a series of scenes. Fields and Gloria Jean are flying to an exotic location on an airplane, which Fields specifies has an open-air rear observatory platform. Fields has run-ins with a couple of eccentric characters in which he tangles with a large, angry man in the lower berth and manages to hit him with a mallet and convince him that someone else did it. At one point Gloria Jean asks Uncle Bill why he never married, and he answers, "I was in love with a beautiful blonde once. She drove me to drink. That's the one thing I'm indebted to her for." When Fields's flask falls out of the plane, Fields jumps out after it and his niece cries out in horror. But he lands safely in a "nest" high atop a cliff, a home populated by a beautiful, young, naive girl (Susan Miller) and her cynical mother (Margaret Dumont). Meanwhile, the plane lands, and Gloria Jean sings a traditional Russian song to a group of peasants. She reunites with Fields in the village, where Fields learns that Dumont is wealthy. He returns to Dumont's mountaintop retreat, only to find a romantic rival (Leon Errol). Fields is about to marry Dumont when Gloria Jean takes him aside and convinces him that this is a bad idea, and they make a swift exit.

At this point, Pangborn has had enough of the absurdity of the script and tells Fields to leave the studio. Fields goes to an ice cream parlor to drown his sorrows. In a rare aside to the camera, Fields remarks, "This scene is supposed to be in a saloon, but the censor cut it out!"

At the studio, when Gloria Jean learns Fields has been sent away, she tells the flustered Pangborn that if her uncle is fired, then she quits. She and Fields make plans to travel, and she goes into a shop to buy some new clothes. Just then, a middle-aged matron (Kay Deslys) asks for help getting to the maternity hospital, where her daughter is about to give birth. Fields volunteers, thinking the matron herself is in distress, and she takes the back seat of his car. He speeds her through the streets and expressways of Los Angeles, where he tangles with pedestrians, cars, and a hook-and-ladder fire truck. When his passenger passes out, Fields drives even more urgently. He arrives at the hospital, wrecking his car in the process, and his passenger is shaken but unhurt. Gloria Jean, who has just arrived by taxi, asks Uncle Bill if he's all right. He replies, "Good thing I didn't have an accident. I'd never have gotten here." Gloria Jean smiles and says to the audience, "My Uncle Bill... but I still love him!"

Songs
Gloria Jean sings the following songs in this film:
"Estrellita" ("Little Star") - in Spanish, music and lyrics by M. M. Ponce
"Voices of Spring" -- music by Johann Strauss II, with special lyrics in English
"Hot Cha Cha"—nonsense song by Universal's musical director Charles Previn
""Очи чёрные" ("Ochi chyornye" or "Dark Eyes") - in Russian, traditional Russian folk song

Production
Fields' preferred title for the film was The Great Man, which had also been his original title for The Bank Dick, but this title was once again rejected by Universal. When the title was changed, Fields was afraid that "Never Give a Sucker an Even Break" would not fit on theater marquees, and it would be abbreviated to "W. C. Fields - Sucker".

Fields' first version of the script was only 12 pages long. The studio told him to expand it, which Fields' did, to 96 pages. This was still not enough, so Fields hired screenwriters John T. Neville and Prescott Chaplin to expand it.  This version came in at 156 pages. This was the version of the script which was rejected in April 1941 by the Hays Office because it was "filled with vulgar and suggestive scenes and dialogue" and had "innumerable jocular references to drinking and liquor," the producer was referred to as a "pansy", and the Fields character ogled women's breasts and legs. The censors also objected to "all dialogue and showing of bananas and pineapples" which they felt was "a play upon an obscene story."  A revised script was approved two months later. The studio hired a number of writers to continue work on the script, none of them billed, but Fields hated their version, calling it "the worst script I ever read." He was inclined to "throw it in their faces", but director Eddie Cline told him not to—he would shoot Fields's own script, and the studio would be none the wiser, which turned out to be the case.

Aftermath
After the positive reception of Fields' previous Universal picture, The Bank Dick, the studio had already touted The Great Man as one of its major features of the year, to be released during the holiday season of 1941. "That was the plan until the studio heads saw the film," reported Gloria Jean's biographers. "In late September they conveniently forgot about their bonded schedule, changed the title from The Great Man back to Never Give a Sucker an Even Break,  and moved the release date up to October 10, placing the Fields film among a succession of lesser releases... Universal, deciding that this would be Fields's last picture at the studio, gave a choice November release date to Olsen and Johnson instead. Sucker became a non-event." Parts of the film were reshot without Fields's participation, and the film was re-edited and rearranged into a crazy-quilt of comedy sequences. "By keeping the film as nonsensical as possible, like [Olsen and Johnson's] Hellzapoppin', Universal could bridge Fields's chaotic continuity and gloss over his occasional absences." The outrageously zany film played to mixed reviews but is today considered one of Fields's classics. It has been called "a thinly disguised attack on the Hollywood studio system."

Upon release, columnist Ted Strauss in The New York Times said, "We are not yet quite sure that this latest opus is even a movie – no such harum-scarum collection of song, slapstick and thumbnail sketches has defied dramatic law in recent history. We are more certain that at its worst the film is extravagantly bad, no less that William Claude is wonderful," further stating, "Yes, some parts of the film you will find incomprehensibly silly. Probably you also will laugh your head off."

This was Fields's last starring film. By this time, he was 61 years old and in declining health, for a lifetime of alcoholism had taken its toll. Fields often had to recuperate in his dressing room between takes. He was already planning his next film for Universal, with Gloria Jean and Anne Nagel from the cast of Sucker rejoining him, but after the lukewarm performance of Sucker, Universal dropped him. The studio had the increasingly popular Abbott and Costello under contract and no longer needed Fields.

Cast

W. C. Fields as The Great Man, W. C. Fields/Uncle Bill 
Gloria Jean as His Niece, Gloria Jean 
Leon Errol as His Rival, Leon
Billy Lenhart and Kenneth Brown as His Hecklers (as Butch and Buddy) 
Margaret Dumont as Mrs. Hemogloben 
Susan Miller as Ouliotta Delight Hemogloben 
Franklin Pangborn as the producer, Mr. Pangborn 
Mona Barrie as the producer's wife, Mrs. Pangborn 
Charles Lang as the young engineer, Peter Carson
Anne Nagel as Madame Gorgeous, Gloria Jean's mother
Nell O'Day as salesgirl
Irving Bacon as Tom, the soda jerk
Jody Gilbert as the waitress
Minerva Urecal as Mrs. Pastromi, the cleaning woman
Emmett Vogan as Steve Roberts, engineer
Carlotta Monti as Pangborn's receptionist

Uncredited:
Leon Belasco as Gloria Jean's accompanist
Dave Willock as Johnson, the movie director
Jack Lipson as the Russian plane passenger
Claud Allister as the British plane passenger
Kay Deslys as Mrs. Wilson, visiting the hospital
Michael Visaroff as a Russian peasant
Richard Alexander as a burly man

Sources:

Cast notes:
Carlotta Monti, who plays Pangborn's receptionist, was Fields' mistress. She later wrote an autobiography which was made into the 1976 film W. C. Fields and Me, which starred Rod Steiger and Valerie Perrine.

References

External links

 
 
 

1941 films
1941 comedy films
American black-and-white films
Films about filmmaking
Films directed by Edward F. Cline
Universal Pictures films
American comedy films
Films about con artists
1940s English-language films
1940s American films